Rachel Treweek (née Montgomery; born 4 February 1963 at Broxbourne, Hertfordshire) is an Anglican bishop who sits in the House of Lords as a Lord Spiritual.
Since June 2015, she has served as  Bishop of Gloucester, the first female diocesan bishop in the Church of England. A former speech and language therapist, from 2011 until 2015, she was the Archdeacon of Hackney in the Diocese of London.

Early life and career
Born Rachel Montgomery on 4 February 1963, she was educated at Broxbourne School, a state school in Broxbourne, Hertfordshire. She studied at the University of Reading graduating in 1984 with a Bachelor of Arts (BA) degree in linguistics and language pathology.

Treweek's first career was as a speech and language therapist. After six years as a paediatric speech therapist in the National Health Service, she left her job to train for ordination in the Church of England.

Ordained ministry
Treweek studied for ordination at Wycliffe Hall, Oxford, an Anglican theological college, and graduated with a Bachelor of Theology (BTh) degree in 1994. She was ordained deacon at Petertide 1994 (3 July), by David Hope, Bishop of London, at St Paul's Cathedral, and was introduced by Martin Wharton, Bishop of Kingston as a curate, the following Petertide (27 June 1995), at St George and All Saints Church, Tufnell Park, London, then becoming Associate Vicar, from 1997 to 1999. In 1999, she was appointed Vicar of St James-the-Less, Bethnal Green, London. In addition to the incumbency, she was appointed the continuing ministerial education officer for the Diocese of London.

In 2006, Treweek left parish ministry on her appointment as the Archdeacon of Northolt; this made her one of six archdeacons in the Diocese of London. She held the position for five years before becoming the Archdeacon of Hackney on 14 May 2011. She relinquished this appointment on confirmation of her appointment as Bishop of Gloucester on 15 June 2015.

In September 2013, Treweek was elected as one of eight "participant observers" of the House of Bishops representing the South East of England. Such observers were senior female priests who attended and participated in meetings of the House of Bishops until six women were sitting in the House by right as bishops. She attended her first meeting of the House of Bishops of the General Synod of the Church of England on 9 December 2013.

Episcopal ministry
On 26 March 2015, it was announced that Treweek was to become the next Bishop of Gloucester, the diocesan bishop of the Diocese of Gloucester. Though there had been two women appointed bishops previously in the Church of England, she was the first woman to be appointed a diocesan bishop, rather than as a suffragan bishop. She was the first woman to become a bishop in the Province of Canterbury, jointly with Sarah Mullally, Bishop of Crediton. On 15 June 2015, her election was confirmed during a sitting of the Arches Court of Canterbury at St Mary-le-Bow, City of London. At this point, she legally became the bishop of Gloucester. On 22 July 2015, she was consecrated by Justin Welby, Archbishop of Canterbury, during a ceremony at Canterbury Cathedral, she and Sarah Mullally (later Bishop of London) being the first women to be consecrated as bishops in the Church of England. On 19 September 2015, she was installed at Gloucester Cathedral as the 41st Bishop of Gloucester.

Following the Lords Spiritual (Women) Act 2015, Treweek was the first woman bishop eligible to be admitted to the House of Lords as a Lord Spiritual when parliament reconvened in September 2015 after its summer recess, in place of Tim Stevens who had retired as Bishop of Leicester and Convenor of the Bishops in the Lords. She sent back the first version of her writ of summons because it referred to her as a “Right Reverend Father in God” (bishops' writs have simply omitted “Father in God” ever since — even for male bishops). Then, on 26 October 2015, she was introduced to the House by Justin Welby, Archbishop of Canterbury, and Richard Chartres, Bishop of London. In 2020, she became (additionally) Bishop to HM Prisons.

Theology and views
Treweek believes that God should be considered to be neither male nor female and tries to avoid using gender-specific pronouns when referring to God. Explaining this view, "she said she personally prefers to say neither "he" nor "she", but "God". "Sometimes I lapse, but I try not to," the bishop told The Observer." The Diocese of Gloucester announced that, in January 2017, Treweek would preside at an LGBTI Eucharist with Inclusive Church.

She supports the celebration and blessing of "faithful monogamous same-sex relationships", but does not support changing the Church of England's doctrine of marriage (i.e. that marriage is the life long union of one man and one woman).

Personal life
In 2006, she married Guy Treweek; he is a Church of England priest and was priest-in-charge of two ancient City of London parishes at the time of her appointment to the episcopate.

Patronages
Bishop Treweek is a Patron of Prisoners Abroad, a charity supporting the welfare of Britons imprisoned overseas and their families.

Honours
On 8 July 2016, Bishop Treweek received an honorary doctorate (Hon DLitt) from her alma mater, the University of Reading.

Styles
The Reverend Rachel Montgomery (1994March 2006)
The Reverend Rachel Treweek (MarchMay 2006)
The Venerable Rachel Treweek (May 20062015)
The Right Reverend Rachel Treweek (2015–present)

References 

1963 births
Living people
Alumni of the University of Reading
Alumni of Wycliffe Hall, Oxford
Archdeacons of Northolt
Archdeacons of Hackney
Bishops of Gloucester
Lords Spiritual
21st-century Church of England bishops
Women Anglican bishops
Speech and language pathologists
Bishops to HM Prisons
20th-century Anglican theologians
21st-century Anglican theologians